Hypomicrogaster is a genus of braconid wasps in the family Braconidae. There are more than 40 described species in Hypomicrogaster, found in North, Central, and South America.

Species
These 48 species belong to the genus Hypomicrogaster:

 Hypomicrogaster acarnas Nixon, 1965
 Hypomicrogaster aodoa Valerio, 2015
 Hypomicrogaster aplebis Valerio, 2015
 Hypomicrogaster areolaris (Blanchard, 1947)
 Hypomicrogaster cernus Valerio, 2015
 Hypomicrogaster crocina Valerio, 2015
 Hypomicrogaster daktulios Valerio, 2015
 Hypomicrogaster deltis Valerio, 2015
 Hypomicrogaster duo Valerio, 2015
 Hypomicrogaster ecus Nixon, 1965
 Hypomicrogaster epipagis Valerio, 2015
 Hypomicrogaster espera Valerio, 2015
 Hypomicrogaster evrys Valerio, 2015
 Hypomicrogaster guille Valerio, 2015
 Hypomicrogaster hektos Valerio, 2015
 Hypomicrogaster hupsos Valerio, 2015
 Hypomicrogaster imitator (Ashmead, 1900)
 Hypomicrogaster ingensis Valerio, 2015
 Hypomicrogaster insolita Valerio, 2015
 Hypomicrogaster inversalis Valerio, 2015
 Hypomicrogaster koinos Valerio, 2015
 Hypomicrogaster larga Valerio, 2015
 Hypomicrogaster laxa Valerio & Mason, 2015
 Hypomicrogaster linearis Valerio, 2015
 Hypomicrogaster lineata Valerio, 2015
 Hypomicrogaster luisi Valerio, 2015
 Hypomicrogaster masoni Valerio, 2015
 Hypomicrogaster mesos Valerio, 2015
 Hypomicrogaster mikrosus Valerio, 2015
 Hypomicrogaster multa Valerio, 2015
 Hypomicrogaster pablouzagai (Fernandez-Triana & Boudreault, 2016)
 Hypomicrogaster pectinata Valerio, 2015
 Hypomicrogaster plagios Valerio, 2015
 Hypomicrogaster pollex Valerio, 2015
 Hypomicrogaster rugosa Valerio, 2015
 Hypomicrogaster samarshalli (Fernández-Triana, 2010)
 Hypomicrogaster scindus Valerio, 2015
 Hypomicrogaster sicingens Valerio, 2015
 Hypomicrogaster sicpollex Valerio, 2015
 Hypomicrogaster sicscindus Valerio, 2015
 Hypomicrogaster siderion Valerio, 2015
 Hypomicrogaster spatulae Valerio, 2015
 Hypomicrogaster specialis Valerio, 2015
 Hypomicrogaster tantilla Valerio, 2015
 Hypomicrogaster tetra Valerio, 2015
 Hypomicrogaster tydeus Nixon, 1965
 Hypomicrogaster zan Valerio, 2015
 Hypomicrogaster zonaria (Say, 1836)

References

Further reading

 
 
 

Microgastrinae